The Kara Neumann case was an incident in which parents of a sick child refused to treat her with anything other than prayer, resulting in the child's death. The 11-year-old child, Madeline Kara Neumann, of Weston, Wisconsin, died of undiagnosed diabetes on March 23, 2008, after Kara's parents, Leilani and Dale Neumann, prayed for their dying daughter instead of seeking medical help. The parents were Pentecostals who did not belong to an organized religion. They had obtained medical care in the past, but had come to believe that there are spiritual root causes to sickness and that prayer and strong religious beliefs will cure any health problems. They decided not to go to doctors for treatment anymore, out of a belief that they would be "putting the doctor before God", amounting to idolatry and sin.

The parents were charged with second-degree reckless homicide by the Marathon County district attorney in separate trials. Dale Neumann was convicted on May 22, 2009, and Leilani was convicted on August 1, 2009. On October 6, 2009, both parents were sentenced to 10 years of probation, with six months jail time to be served over a six-year period. On July 3, 2013, by a 6-to-1 margin the Wisconsin Supreme Court upheld the convictions. Kara Neumann's case sparked renewed discussion about faith healing in the United States.

References

2008 crimes in the United States
2008 in Wisconsin
March 2008 events in the United States
March 2008 crimes
Crimes in Wisconsin
Marathon County, Wisconsin